Angelina College is a public community college with its main campus in Lufkin, Texas. It has nine off-campus centers in Crockett, Hemphill, Jasper, Livingston (Polk County Center), Nacogdoches, Pineland (Sabine Center), San Augustine, Trinity, and Woodville. The college enrolls upwards of 5,000 students in its undergraduate degree programs. In addition to its academic/vocational programs, the college has a community services division that oversees the college's Adult Education Consortium, Continuing Education Units, and Career Development initiatives.

History 
Angelina College was founded on September 24, 1966, with construction of the original seven-building campus having begun in November 1967. It first opened its doors to students in the fall of 1968.

Dr. Jack Hudgins was elected the first president of Angelina College December 12, 1966, by the trustees.  Hudgins stepped down in 1991 and was succeeded by Dr. Larry Phillips. Hudgins remained on campus as a part-time music instructor.  To honor his tenure as the president, the fine arts building was renamed Hudgins Hall in 2001.

In 2015, Dr. Michael Simon succeeded Dr. Phillips as president making him the third president of the college.

Campus 
College buildings include :
Angelina Center for the Arts and Temple Theater
Temple Hall (business)
Hudgins Hall (liberal and fine arts)
Liberal Arts
Science and Mathematics
Technology and Workforce Development Center
Health Careers I & II
Social & Behavioral Sciences
Community Services Center
Shands Gymnasium
Angelina College Library
Angelina Police Academy
Angelina College Small Business Development Center

The Lufkin campus has a dormitory for students.

A branch, Polk County Community College, opened in the fall of 2014. The college offers various classes and two-year associate degrees.

Academics 
The college offers a transfer core curriculum and associate degrees in 30 occupational programs, certificates, and associate of applied sciences degrees, 31 programs or classes in community services (noncredit) that lead to certifications or licensure, adult education, GED, and ESL courses. Angelina College averages 5,000 students per semester with the majority of those attending class on-campus.

Angelina College is accredited by the Southern Association of Colleges and Schools to award the Associate of Arts, Associate of Science, and Associate of Applied Science degrees.  In addition, it offers certificates and degrees in various programs tailored toward the local economy, especially programs in the medical field such as respiratory care, radiology, sonography, EMS, nursing (vocation and a two-year RN program), pharmacy technician, and surgical technician.  

One of its unique offerings is a licensed vocational nurse program, housed on the campus of Hudson Independent School District, supposedly the first such program in the nation to be offered on a high-school campus. The college also offers a bachelors of science in nursing and a master of science in nursing, through Texas A&M, to students enrolled in the program at the Lufkin Campus. This program was introduced to the college in 2016, and it is meant to benefit those students who have graduated with their ASN from Angelina College to continue their careers in nursing without having to leave the East Texas area.

Divisions 
Academic programs in the college are organized into these divisions:

Business Division
Fine Arts Division 
Liberal Arts Division 
Technology and Workforce Division
Health Careers Division 
Science and Mathematics Division

Service area 
As defined by the Texas Legislature, the official service area of Angelina College is:
all of Angelina, Houston, Nacogdoches, Polk, Sabine, San Augustine, Trinity, and Tyler Counties,
the Alto and Wells school districts, located within Cherokee County,
the Burkeville and Newton school districts, located within Newton County,
the Jasper Independent School District, located within Jasper County,
the Coldspring-Oakhurst and Shepherd school districts, located within San Jacinto County (note that the Texas Education Code has Shepherd misspelled as "Shepard"),
the portion of the Brookeland Independent School District located within Newton and Jasper Counties,
the portion of the Colmesneil Independent School District located within Jasper County, and
the portion of the Trinity Independent School District located within Walker County.

Athletics 
The school colors are royal blue, Columbia blue, orange, and white, and the school mascot is the Roadrunner. Angelina College competes in the NJCAA Region XIV Texas Eastern Conference in men's and women's basketball, baseball, softball, and soccer.

Notable people 

Clay Buchholz, MLB pitcher
Mark Calaway, pro wrestler known as The Undertaker in World Wrestling Entertainment
Andrew Cashner, MLB pitcher
Dennis Cook, MLB pitcher
Lamont Mack, basketball forward
Josh Tomlin, MLB pitcher

References

External links

 
Buildings and structures in Angelina County, Texas
Community colleges in Texas
Education in Angelina County, Texas
Education in Houston County, Texas
Education in Nacogdoches County, Texas
Educational institutions established in 1966
Universities and colleges accredited by the Southern Association of Colleges and Schools
1966 establishments in Texas
Lufkin, Texas
NJCAA athletics